The Czechoslovakian Women's Volleyball Championship was an annual competition for women's volleyball teams in Czechoslovakia . The Championship were held from the year 1931 to 1992 . The most titles has been won by Praha team "Ruda Hvezda" (since 1990 "Olimp") - with 12.

The organizer of the championship was the Czechoslovak Volleyball Union (ČSVS). After the announcement of the upcoming disintegration of Czechoslovakia on January 1, 1993, ČSVS split into the Czech Volleyball Union and the Slovak Volleyball Federation. Since the 1992/93 season, independent championships of the Czech Republic and Slovakia have been held.

Winners list 

! Years
! Champions
! Runners-up
! Third place
|- 
|1931 || VVS Praha ||  || 
|-
|1932 ||  VS Marathon Praha ||  ||
|- 
|1933 || VS Marathon Praha ||  || 
|-
|1934 ||  Sokol Plzeň I ||  ||
|- 
|1935 || Sokol Plzeň I ||  || 
|-
|1936 ||  Sokol Plzeň I  || Vysokoškolský sport Praha || Sokol Brno 
|- 
|1937 || Sokol Plzeň I ||  || 
|- 
| 1938 || colspan=3 align="center"| Competition Not Disputed
|- 
|1939 || Sokol Plzeň I ||  || 
|-
|1940 ||  Sokol Plzeň I  ||  ||
|- 
|1941 || SK Viktoria Plzeň ||  || 
|-
|1942 ||  SK Viktoria Plzeň  ||  ||
|- 
|1943 || SK Viktoria Plzeň ||  || 
|- 
| 1944 || colspan=3 align="center"| Competition Not Disputed
|- 
|1945 || SK Zaměstnanci Prahy ||  || 
|-
|1946 ||  SK Zaměstnanci Prahy  ||  ||
|- 
|1947 || SK Zaměstnanci Prahy||  || 
|-
|1948 ||  Sokol Jáma Trojice Slezská Ostrava  ||  ||
|- 
|1949 || Sokol Pražský ||  || 
|-
|1950 || Sokol Pražský  || Sokol Jáma Trojice || Sokol Královo Pole 
|- 
|1951 || Sokol OKD Ostrava ||  ||
|-
|1952 || Sokol Baník Ostrava ||  ||
|- 
|1953 || Sokol Baník Ostrava ||  ||
|-
|1954 ||  Tatran Valašské Meziříčí  ||  ||
|- 
|1955 || ÚDA Praha || Slavoj Odívání || Tatran Valašské Meziříčí
|-
|1956 || ÚDA Praha || Tatran Valašské Meziříčí || Slavoj Praha
|- 
|1957 || Slavoj Praha || Tatran Valašské Meziříčí || Dynamo Praha
|-
|1958 || Tatran Valašské Meziříčí || Slavoj Praha || Slavoj Plzeň
|-
|1959 ||  Dynamo Praha || Slavoj Praha || Valašské Meziříčí
|-
|1960 || Slavoj Plzeň MP || Dynamo Praha || Spartak Královo Pole Brno
|-
|1961 || Tatran Střešovice || Dynamo Praha || Slávia Bratislava UK
|-
|1962 || Dynamo Praha || Tatran Střešovice || Slávia Bratislava UK
|-
|1963 || Dynamo Praha || ČKD Praha || Tatran Střešovice 
|-
|1964 || ČKD Praha  || Slávia Bratislava UK || SK Slávia Praha
|-
|1965 || SK Slávia Praha || Slávia Bratislava UK || Jiskra Jablonec
|-
|1966 || Slávia Bratislava UK  || Jiskra Jablonec || Tatran Střešovice 
|-
|1967 || Slávia Bratislava UK ||  SK Slávia Praha || Slavoj Praha
|-
|1968 || Slávia Bratislava UK  || Tatran Střešovice || Slavoj Praha
|-
|1969 || Tatran Střešovice  || VŠ Bratislava || SK Slávia Praha
|-
|1970 || Tatran Střešovice || Slávia Bratislava UK || Rudá Hvězda Praha
|-
|1971 || Tatran Střešovice || Slávia Bratislava UK || Technika Brno 
|-
|1972 || Tatran Střešovice ||  || 
|-
|1973 || Tatran Střešovice  ||  || 
|-
|1974 || Rudá Hvězda Praha  ||  || 
|-
|1975 || Rudá Hvězda Praha  ||  || 
|-
|1976 || Slávia Bratislava UK ||  || 
|-
|1977 || Rudá Hvězda Praha ||   || 
|-
|1978 || Slávia Bratislava UK  ||  || 
|-
|1979 || Rudá Hvězda Praha  ||  || 
|-
|1980 || Rudá Hvězda Praha || Slávia Bratislava UK || Lokomotiva Liberec
|-
|1981 || Rudá Hvězda Praha || Slávia Bratislava UK || Lokomotiva Liberec
|-
|1982 || Slávia Bratislava UK || Rudá Hvězda Praha|| Lokomotiva Liberec
|-
|1983 || Slávia Bratislava UK || Rudá Hvězda Praha || KPS Brno
|-
|1984 || Rudá Hvězda Praha || Slávia UK Bratislava || Lokomotiva Liberec
|-
|1985 || Rudá Hvězda Praha || Slávia UK Bratislava || Červená Hviezda Bratislava
|-
|1986 || Rudá Hvězda Praha || Slávia UK Bratislava || Slávia Praha IPS
|-
|1987 || Rudá Hvězda Praha || Slávia UK Bratislava || Jiskra Textilana Liberec
|-
|1988 || Rudá Hvězda Praha || Slávia UK Bratislava || Slávia Praha IPS
|-
|1989 || Slávia UK Bratislava  || Rudá Hvězda Praha || Slávia Praha IPS
|-
|1990 || KPS Brno || Slávia UK Bratislava || Červená Hviezda Bratislava
|-
|1991 || TJ Slávia UK Bratislava  || TJ KPS Brno || PSK Olymp Praha
|-
|1992 || PSK Olymp Praha || TJ KPS Brno || SK Slávia Praha

Sources

References

External links
Slovakian Volleyball Federation
Czech Volleyball Association

Czechoslovakia
1931 establishments in Czechoslovakia
Volleyball in Czechoslovakia
Czechoslovak Women League